The Assistant Secretary of the Air Force (Acquisition, Technology, and Logistics) (SAF/AQ) is a civilian position in the Department of the Air Force that is appointed by the president of the United States and confirmed by the United States Senate. This position is established under Title 10 US Code Section 9016 and is one of five Assistant Secretary positions under the Secretary of the Air Force. The Assistant Secretary reports to the Secretary of the Air Force.

Under the law a Principal Military Deputy serves with the Assistant Secretary of the Air Force for Acquisition. The Principal Military Deputy is required to be an active duty officer with a background in acquisition and program management. If the Assistant Secretary position is vacant the law permits the Principal Military Deputy to serve up to a year as the Acting Assistant Secretary. Of the five Assistant Secretary positions established by law, only the Assistant Secretary for Acquisition is required to have a Principal Military Deputy.

Darlene Costello is presently serving as acting Assistant Secretary for the second time. During the Obama and Trump administrations, Costello served as acting Assistant Secretary, from February 2016 to February 2018. In 2018, Will Roper was confirmed to the role, serving from February 2018 to January 2021. Despite Roper's requests to the Biden transition to be retained in the position in the new administration, his efforts went unheeded, and he resigned on January 20 as is custom. Upon his departure, Darlene Costello again became acting Assistant Secretary until a new Secretary is appointed. With 3 years in the role as of January 2022, Costello's service as SAF/AQ, spanning three presidencies and four Secretaries of the Air Force, ranks among the longest in the history of the position, despite never being confirmed by the Senate.

On July 16, 2021, President Joe Biden nominated Andrew Hunter, a defense industry/acquisition researcher and former Pentagon official, for the position, and Hunter was confirmed by the Senate on February 2, 2022. Hunter was formerly a senior fellow at the Center for Strategic and International Studies' International Security Program and director of CSIS' Defense-Industrial Initiatives Group.

Responsibilities

The Assistant Secretary of the Air Force for Acquisition serves as the single service acquisition executive (SAE) and the Senior Procurement Executive for the Department of the Air Force. They are responsible for acquisition and product support for all Air Force acquisition programs and manages the Air Force science and technology program.

They provides direction, guidance and supervision of all matters pertaining to the formulation, review, approval and execution of acquisition plans, policies and programs. The Assistant Secretary oversees $40 billion annual investments that include major programs like the KC-46A Pegasus, F-35 Lighting II, B-21 Raider, as well as capability areas such as information technology and command and control, intelligence, surveillance and reconnaissance (C4ISR) systems.

History

The Assistant Secretary of the Air Force for Acquisition position was created in 1987 by National Security Decision Directive 219, following recommendations from President Reagan's Blue Ribbon Commission on Defense Management. The Commission recommended the Department of Defense have clear lines of authority for acquisition management and outlined roles and responsibilities between the Office of the Secretary of Defense and the military departments. This move established the Defense Acquisition Executive, the Service Acquisition Executives for each military department, Program Executive Officers who manage execution for a portfolio of programs.

Prior to 1987, similar duties and responsibilities now carried out by the Assistant Secretary for Acquisition were performed by offices in the Headquarters Secretariat with the following names and dates:

Assistant Secretary for Material - May 1951 to February 1964

Special Assistant for Research and Development - September 1950-February 1955

Assistant Secretary for Research and Development - March 1955 to May 1977

Assistant Secretary for Research, Development and Logistics - May 1977-April 1987

Assistant Secretaries of the Air Force (Acquisition, Technology, and Logistics)

References

 John J. Martin, Robert J. Hermann, Alton G. Keel, Martin F. Chen and Thomas E. Cooper all held the title "Assistant Secretary (Research, Development, and Logistics)." Daniel Rak was the first Acting Assistant Secretary (Acquisition).

External links
 Air Force Acquisition website

 
United States Air Force